During the first seven years of existence (1960–1966) of the American Football League (AFL, 1960–1969), the AFL and the NFL held separate, competing drafts for college football talent.

These drafts were conducted differently in each league, with the AFL, as a new league, starting its existence with the 1960 AFL draft that was actually held in December, 1959 and had 33 rounds.   Each AFL team had "territorial rights" to players from its general region for a "bonus" draft selection, so that teams could sign players who were known to their fans.  These were not "picked" as such, but agreed on by consensus.  The 1960 AFL draft proceeded with teams selecting by lot and player position, e.g., each team selected quarterbacks from the available list, then running backs, etc. These were not listed in order of selection, but alphabetically in two groups called "First Selections" and "Second Selections" by each team.  Minneapolis-Saint Paul was originally included in the AFL draft on November 22, 1959.  When the Minneapolis-Saint Paul owners reneged on their agreement to join the AFL and jumped to the NFL, some of the remaining AFL teams signed several players from the deserters' draft list.  To compensate for this, after the Oakland Raiders' AFL franchise was granted, an allocation draft was held, to permit the Raiders to stock their team with players from the other seven AFL teams.

The established NFL held drafts more similar to the present day, in which the team with the worst record from the previous year selected first, and the reigning league champion selected last.  Starting in 1961, the AFL also followed this procedure.

Because of the competition between the leagues, unlike today's drafts, they were held soon after the end of the football season in each league, often before the college bowls were over.  Many players, such as LSU's Billy Cannon signed pro contracts "under the goalposts" at bowl games; and in the College East-West Game and other all-star college bowls, many players wore the helmets of the professional team that they had signed with.

The AFL was at a disadvantage in name-recognition with the established NFL, but contrary to common belief, during this period, its franchises signed a significant number of stars away from the older league.  These included Cannon, as well as eventual Hall of Famers Lance Alworth, Buck Buchanan, Jim Otto, Billy Shaw, and Nick Buoniconti, and such standouts as Matt Snell, Tom Sestak, Charley Hennigan, Abner Haynes, Johnny Robinson and many others.

References

American Football League draft
National Football League Draft